Nuts in May (1917) is a silent comedy short, directed by Robin Williamson, produced by Isadore Bernstein, and featuring Stan Laurel, billed as Stan Jefferson, in his onscreen debut.

The short was filmed at Bernstein Studios, in Hollywood, California. "A fragment" of the film survives (a little over 60 seconds).

Plot
Stan plays a resident of "Home for the Weak-Minded", apparently a lunatic asylum. Stan's particular delusion is that he thinks he's Napoleon.  Stan walks the grounds of the cuckoo-hatch sticking his right hand into his shirt and wearing a Napoleon hat. He thinks he's Napoleon, but he gives the salute of the British army.

Stan has his own personal keeper in the asylum: a taller moustached man who wears a kepi so that Stan will think he's a French officer.

Stan gets out and finds some local boys, who eagerly join him in playing soldier. Stan's kepi-wearing keeper pursues him through the film. Stan hijacks a steamroller, and Stan nearly runs down some workers in a road crew.

The surviving footage consists of Stan in various scrapes with a steamroller, ending with him in a straw boater being dragged off to the asylum.

Cast
 Stan Laurel (as Stan Jefferson)
 Mae Dahlberg
 Lucille Arnold
 Owen Evans
 Charles Arling

See also
 List of incomplete or partially lost films
 Mixed Nuts (1922), a film using footage from Nuts in May

References

External links

Nuts in May at SilentEra

1917 films
American silent short films
American black-and-white films
1917 comedy films
1910s English-language films
1917 short films
Silent American comedy films
Lost American films
American comedy short films
1917 lost films
Lost comedy films
1910s American films